The discography of Scottish pop rock band Texas contains 10 studio albums, one live album, three compilation albums and 43 singles. Their most successful single to date is "Say What You Want" (1997), which peaked at number three on the UK Singles Chart.

Texas made their performing debut in March 1988 at Scotland's University of Dundee. They took their name from the 1984 Wim Wenders movie Paris, Texas. The band released their debut album Southside in 1989, along with the debut single "I Don't Want a Lover" which was a worldwide success, charting at number eight on the UK Singles Chart and other high charting positions in Europe. Southside debuted at number three in the United Kingdom and number 88 on the US Billboard 200 album chart. Despite the success of Southside, follow-up albums Mothers Heaven and Ricks Road were less successful in the UK. 

Texas' White on Blonde album was one of the best selling albums of 1997. To date, it has been certified six-fold platinum in the UK, making it the band's best selling UK album. Their only other album to reach a six-fold platinum certification was 2000's The Greatest Hits. Follow up The Hush was also successful, debuting at number one on the UK album charts and being certified triple platinum. Texas released a further two studio albums, Careful What You Wish For in 2003, and Red Book in 2005, both of which were certified gold in the UK. After the release of Red Book and a tour to support the album's release, Texas entered a self-imposed hiatus. Lead singer Sharleen Spiteri launched a successful solo career, releasing her debut solo album Melody in 2008.

Albums

Studio albums

Compilation albums

Live albums

Extended plays

Singles

As featured artist
 "Until the Next Time" (Moonlight Matters featuring Texas) (2017)

Other contributions

Videos

Video albums

Music videos

References

Discographies of British artists
Rock music group discographies